Sabina Wölbitsch (born 27 March 1966) is a Swiss former footballer who played 34 times for the Switzerland national football team between 1986 and 1994. At club level she represented clubs in Switzerland, Italy, and Germany.

Club career
After a successful spell with SV Seebach, which included winning two "Doubles", Wölbitsch joined Italian Serie A club Reggiana on a professional contract in 1989. She won the league title in her first season but left after a year to return to the Swiss Nationalliga A with DFC Bern.

In March 1992 Wölbitsch signed for TuS Niederkirchen of the German Frauen-Bundesliga. Initially she continued working in Switzerland and commuted to training and matches in Germany. The team won the league in 1992–93. In 1996 Wölbitsch wanted to transfer to TuS Ahrbach, but Niederkirchen refused to release her and she missed the entire season. She finished her career with FSV Frankfurt.

International career

Wölbitsch won her first cap for Switzerland in a 3–1 friendly win over Iceland at Valbjarnarvöllur, Reykjavík, on 21 August 1986. She made her 34th and final national team appearance on 4 May 1994, in a 1–1 UEFA Women's Euro 1995 qualifying draw with Croatia at Stadion Kranjčevićeva, Zagreb.

Honours

Club
SV Seebach
Nationalliga A: 1983, 1985, 1987, 1988
Swiss Women's Cup: 1986, 1987, 1988, 1989

Reggiana
Serie A: 1990

DFC Bern
Swiss Women's Cup: 1991

TuS Niederkirchen
Frauen-Bundesliga: 1992–93

References

External links
Profile at SoccerDonna.de 

1966 births
Living people
Swiss women's footballers
Switzerland women's international footballers
Footballers from Zürich
Women's association football defenders
FC Zürich Frauen players
FSV Frankfurt (women) players
Swiss expatriate women's footballers
Swiss expatriate sportspeople in Italy
Swiss expatriate sportspeople in Germany
Expatriate women's footballers in Italy
Expatriate women's footballers in Germany
Frauen-Bundesliga players
Serie A (women's football) players
A.S.D. Reggiana Calcio Femminile players